The IIHF World Junior Championship is an annual event organized by the International Ice Hockey Federation for national under-20 ice hockey teams from around the world.  The 'Top Division' features the top ten ranked hockey nations in the world.  After each tournament, the Directorate of the IIHF selects the Best Goalie, Best Defenceman, and Best Forward of the tournament.  Winners of these awards, along with the countries they represent are shown below from the first official tournament (1977) until present.

Footnotes

References

World Junior Ice Hockey Championships
IIHF World Under 20 Championship